Flatbill refers to the members of two genera of the family Tyrannidae:
Ramphotrigon
Rhynchocyclus

In recent years it has also frequently been used for the members of another genus in the family Tyrannidae:
Tolmomyias